Dance with Me is the debut extended play by Australian pop punk band Short Stack. The EP was released on 27 March 2015 and peaked at number 12 on the ARIA charts.

Reception

Cameron Cooper from The Music AU said "Propped up by some stellar live cuts, the latest release from Short Stack may fall short when held up against the rest of their discography... The EP is likely to satisfy fans while they await the new record, but won't ignite the masses the way This Is Bat Country did."

Track listing

Charts

References

2015 debut EPs
Indie pop EPs
Indie rock EPs
EPs by Australian artists
Short Stack albums